Ambaca  is a town and municipality in Cuanza Norte Province in Angola. The municipality had a population of 61,769 in 2014.

In the 17th century, the Portuguese colonial authorities built a fort in the village of Camabatela, near the Lucala River margin.

References

Populated places in Cuanza Norte Province
Municipalities of Angola